The Kiwi Advanced Research and Education Network (KAREN), now known simply as the REANNZ Network, is a high-capacity, ultra high-speed national research and education network (NREN) connecting New Zealand's tertiary institutions, research organisations, libraries, schools and museums, and the rest of the world. REANNZ (Research and Education Advanced Network New Zealand Ltd), a Crown-owned not-for-profit company, owns and operates KAREN.

Commissioned in late 2006, KAREN links to other established regional and national research and education networks, notably to JANET in the UK and to the Pacific Northwest Gigapop in Seattle.

E-research 
New Zealand researchers and educators can use KAREN to participate in e-research:

 to exchange large volumes of data quickly
 to gain access to large-scale national and international infrastructure
 to collaborate better on research and education projects at a distance.

KAREN aims:

 to enable leading-edge e-research
 to facilitate universal connectivity throughout the New Zealand and international research and education communities
 to encourage broad participation by the research and education sector in New Zealand through accessible technology and reasonable pricing
 to connect the research and education sector to the broader innovation community for pre-commercial research and development based collaboration
 to facilitate participation by multiple telecommunications-sector partners to ensure the greatest possible flexibility for ongoing evolution.

Topology 
KAREN consists of a high-speed optical network connecting points of presence (PoPs) throughout New Zealand. A PoP provides an interconnection point between member sites around the network. Members may connect at one or more POPs. KAREN links universities and Crown Research Institutes within New Zealand via Vodafone fibre-optic cable and Vocus Communications, at speeds up to 100 gigabits per second.

International links to Sydney and to Seattle (Pacific Northwest Gigapop) via the Hawaiki Cable connect KAREN to other national research and education networks in Australia and the United States, and through them to Asia and Europe for Research and Education traffic.

A distinguishing feature of any NREN is its flexibility to meet the diverse needs of all its users. The numbers involved, coupled with increasing sophistication of personal applications, mean that managing demand and maintaining performance require the use of a hybrid Ethernet and Internet Protocol (IP) network architecture.

Uptake 
The research community, driven by the development of various e-science grids, has developed large-scale applications that will individually use high amounts of bandwidth and can in some cases also have strict demands on the network that may require defined resources allocated temporarily to meet performance demands.

KAREN will need to continually evolve so the range of production and development demands can co-exist. This means taking into account the collaborative nature of the development, and research processes, and therefore the need to deliver both advanced network services and associated development facilities to participating organisations.

, 86 organisations at 66 sites across New Zealand had connections to KAREN.

See also
 TuiaNet

References

 Claire Le Couteur. "Introducing KAREN". e.nz magazine Volume 8/4, July/August 2007

External links
 NZNEES Earthquake Simulation, University of Auckland

Academic computer network organizations
Education in New Zealand
Internet in New Zealand